Szalay may refer to:
 Antal Szalay (1912–1960), a Hungarian footballer
 László Szalay or László Szalay de Kéménd (1813–1864), a Hungarian statesman and historian
 Pál Szalay or Pál Szalai (1915–1994), anglicized as Paul Sterling, a high-ranking member of the Budapest police office
 Rachel Szalay, an Australian actress and artist
 Sándor Szalay (physicist) (1909–1987), a pioneer of Hungarian nuclear physics
 Sándor Szalay (figure skater) (1893–1965), a Hungarian pair skater
 Szandra Szalay, a professional Hungarian triathlete
 Thatcher Szalay (1979–), an American football player of Hungarian origin

See also 
 Szalai
 Szalay Goreny or Furmint, a variety of wine grape from the Pontian Balcanica branch of Vitis vinifera

Hungarian-language surnames